Dušan Karol (born 19 May 1983) is a former professional tennis player from the Czech Republic.

Biography
Born in Jihlava, Karol was a right-handed player, with a double handed backhand. 

As a junior he had a win over Tomas Berdych at the Czech Indoor Championships and in another tournament defeated Marcos Baghdatis without dropping a game. He made it to a high as seven in the world in doubles during his junior career.

Karol played on the Challenger circuit as a professional player and won a total of four titles over the course of his career, all in doubles.

He is now the coach of young Czech player Markéta Vondroušová.

Challenger titles

Doubles: (4)

References

External links
 
 

1983 births
Living people
Czech male tennis players
Czech tennis coaches
Sportspeople from Jihlava